James Henry Maclafferty (February 27, 1871 – June 9, 1937) was an American businessman and politician who served two terms as a U.S. Representative from California from 1922 to 1925.

Early life and career 
Born in San Diego, California, MacLafferty moved with his parents to Oakland, California, in 1874, to Eugene, Oreg., in 1880, to Astoria, Oreg., in 1883, and to Tacoma, Washington, in 1884.
He attended the public schools.
He entered the lumber business in Tacoma and continued the same in Seattle until 1889.
He engaged in the wholesale paper business at Chicago in 1899.
He returned to the Pacific coast in 1900 and settled in Oakland, California.
He worked as a traveling salesman and in the paper business.

Congress 
MacLafferty was elected as a Republican to the Sixty-seventh Congress to fill the vacancy caused by the death of John A. Elston.
He was reelected to the Sixty-eighth Congress and served from November 7, 1922, to March 3, 1925.
He was an unsuccessful candidate for reelection in 1924 to the Sixty-ninth Congress.

Later career 
He served as assistant to Secretary of Commerce from March 24, 1925, until August 31, 1927.
He resumed business activities in Oakland, California.
He served as vice president of the Pacific American Steamship Association and of the Shipowners' Association of the Pacific Coast.

Death
He died in Oakland, California, June 9, 1937, and the remains were cremated.

References

External links
 

1871 births
1937 deaths
Republican Party members of the United States House of Representatives from California
People from Oakland, California